Fantasy Romance is a 1991 Hong Kong romantic fantasy comedy film directed by Taylor Wong and starring Joey Wong, Tony Leung and Deanie Ip.

Plot
One time during a traffic accident, Stupid Shing (Tony Leung), a talented but frustrated manhua artist, encounters female ghost Ching-ching (Joey Wong), who was ready to be married to the Blood Demon. During the accident, Shing's car strayed into the underworld and knocks Ching's spirit to the living world.

When Ching arrives to the living world, she has no knowledge about the environment. Fortunately, she meets the Ghost whore (Deanie Ip), where they tell their life experiences to one another. The Ghost whore was a young widow who was accused of adultery and as a result, she and her son were drowned to death.

Ching has a soft spot for Shing and secretly uses her supernatural powers to helps him to move up in his career to become a popular cartoonist, which, however, causes her to become increasingly frail. On the other hand, the Ghost whore's son finally gets the chance to reincarnate as a human. For this to happen, however, the Ghost whore must capture and bring Ching back to the underworld to be married to the Blood Demon. For the sake of her son, the Ghost whore unhesitatingly betrays Ching.

In order to save his lover, Shing is determined to break into the underworld to battle with the Blood Demon. Finally, the Ghost whore sacrifices her soul to save Shing and Ching and battles to the death with the Blood Demon.

Cast
Joey Wong as Ching-ching
Tony Leung Chiu-wai as Stupid Shing
Deanie Ip as Ghost whore
Paul Chun as Lemon Head
Willie Fung as Fool
Tien Feng as Magic Man
Wong Chi-keung as Ghost bully
Chan King as Mahjong gambler
Cheng Siu as Lemon Head's staff

Reception

Critical
LoveHKFilm gave the film a negative review criticizing its humor and "unfunny" and the lack of development of the romance between its two main characters.

Box office
The film grossed HK$1,937,025 at the Hong Kong box office during its theatrical run from 4 to 10 April 1991 in Hong Kong.

References

External links

Fantasy Romance at Hong Kong Cinemagic

1991 films
1991 romantic comedy films
1990s romantic fantasy films
Hong Kong romantic comedy films
Hong Kong romantic fantasy films
Hong Kong fantasy comedy films
Hong Kong ghost films
Hong Kong slapstick comedy films
1990s Cantonese-language films
Films set in Hong Kong
Films shot in Hong Kong
1990s supernatural films
1990s Hong Kong films